Smogornia (a.s.l.) is a peak in the Giant Mountains on the Czech-Polish border. It is situated in the eastern part of the main range.

The peak is not accessible; the main Sudetes trail and Polish–Czech Friendship Trail traverses the mountain c. 300 m north from the peak. On the northern slope of the mountain there is a glacial cirque. The mountain has mild slopes, mostly deforested, covered in mountain pine.

References

Mountains of Poland
Mountains and hills of the Czech Republic
Czech Republic–Poland border
International mountains of Europe